Jì is the Mandarin pinyin romanization of the Chinese surname written  in simplified Chinese and  in traditional Chinese. It is romanized as Chi in Wade–Giles, and Kai or Gai in Cantonese. Ji is listed 113th in the Song Dynasty classic text Hundred Family Surnames. Relatively uncommon, it is not among the top 300 surnames in China. A 2013 study found it was the 316th-most common surname, being shared by 165,0000 people or 0.012% of the population, with the province with the most being Anhui.

Origins
According to the Song dynasty text Lushi, a lineage that descended from Yu the Great was enfeoffed at Ji 计, and adopted it as their surname.

According to the Qing dynasty genealogy text Xingshi Kaolue (姓氏考略), another source of the Ji surname was the Zhou dynasty Dongyi state of Ju, whose capital was at Jijin (计斤, in present-day Jiaozhou, Shandong). Some citizens of Jijin adopted Ji as their surname.

Notable people
Ji Ran (計然), Spring and Autumn period scholar of the state of Yue
Ji Yougong (計有功; fl. 12th century), Song dynasty scholar and official
Ji Sheng (計盛; 15th century), Ming dynasty painter
Ji Cheng (計成; 1582 – c. 1642), Ming dynasty garden designer
Ji Liuqi (計六奇; 1622 – ?), Ming and Qing dynasty historian
Ji Zhiwen (计志文; 1901–1985), Christian leader, founder of the Evangelize China Fellowship
Ji Chunhua (计春华; born 1961), film actor
Ji Cheng (计成; born 1987), first Chinese cyclist to race in a Grand Tour

References

Individual Chinese surnames